Phelbert Russell Lawson (October 22, 1919 – January 5, 2001) was an American Negro league pitcher in the 1940s.

A native of Washington, Virginia, Lawson played for the Cleveland Buckeyes in 1945. He died in Canton, Ohio in 2001 at age 81.

References

External links
 and Seamheads

1919 births
2001 deaths
Cleveland Buckeyes players
Baseball pitchers
Baseball players from Virginia
People from Washington, Virginia
20th-century African-American sportspeople